Metal Blade Records is an American independent record label founded by Brian Slagel in 1982. The US office for Metal Blade is located in Agoura Hills, California. It also has offices in Germany, Japan, Canada, and the UK. The label is distributed in the US by RED Distribution, and in Canada by Sony Music Entertainment. It was distributed by Warner Bros. Records in the United States from 1988 to 1993.

History
Metal Blade Records was founded by Brian Slagel, who at the time was a record store employee in suburban Los Angeles, as a way to increase the recognition of local metal bands. The label's first release was a compilation album called [[Metal Massacre|The New Heavy Metal Revue presents Metal Massacre]], and included Metallica, Ratt, and Black 'n Blue.

Metal Blade artists that have appeared on the Billboard 200 chart include Goo Goo Dolls, Amon Amarth, Trouble, As I Lay Dying, Behemoth, the Black Dahlia Murder, Cannibal Corpse, Fates Warning (the first Metal Blade band to have achieved this), Lizzy Borden, Anvil, Gwar, King Diamond, Job for a Cowboy, Whitechapel, Armored Saint, The Red Chord, Unearth, Between the Buried and Me, Dirty Rotten Imbeciles, Corrosion of Conformity and Cattle Decapitation.

From 1985 to 1998, Metal Blade had a sublabel called Death Records, which released recordings by, and signed bands like Dirty Rotten Imbeciles, Corrosion of Conformity, Civilian Terrorists, Mission of Christ, School of Violence, Cryptic Slaughter, The Mentors, Cannibal Corpse, Atheist, Angkor Wat, Loss for Words, Dr. Know, Beyond Possession, and Dark Funeral.

In 2010 Metal Blade Records joined the RIAA.

IronClad Recordings is an imprint.

On January 18, 2017 Metal Blade Records was inducted into the Hall of Heavy Metal History for their large contribution to the Heavy Metal library. Brian was inducted by special guest Kerry King of Slayer. On August 29, 2017, BMG Rights Management published The Sake of Heaviness: the History of Metal Blade Records, a book on the label's history, co-written by Mark Eglington and the label's founder Brian Slagel.

Notable artists

Current

 Abnormality
 Act of Defiance
 Aeon
 Allegaeon
 Amon Amarth
 Anaal Nathrakh
 Anima
 Arch/Matheos
 Armored Saint
 Battlecross
 Behemoth
 Beyond the Sixth Seal
 Bitch
 The Black Dahlia Murder
 Blood Stain Child
 Brainstorm
 Byzantine
 Candiria
 Cannibal Corpse
 Cataract
 Cattle Decapitation
 Charred Walls of the Damned
 Church of Misery
 The Crown
 Cult of Luna
 Cut Up
 Dawn of Ashes
 Desaster
 Destrage
 The Devil's Blood
 Dew-Scented
 Disillusion
 Don Jamieson
 Downfall of Gaia
 DragonForce
 Entheos
 Ensiferum
 Exumer
 Falconer
 Fates Warning
 Fleshcrawl
 Fleshwrought
 Flotsam and Jetsam
 Goatwhore
 God Dethroned
 Gwar
 Hail of Bullets
 Hammers of Misfortune
Harms Way
 Hate
 If These Trees Could Talk
 Igorrr
 In Solitude
 Ingested
 Intronaut
 Jim Breuer
 Jim Florentine
 Job for a Cowboy
 Killswitch Engage
 King Diamond
 King of Asgard
 Lightning Swords of Death
 Lizzy Borden
 Malefice
 Mercyful Fate
 Mother Feather
 Neaera
 Negligence
 The Ocean Collective
 OSI
 Paths of Possession
 Pentagram
 Poison Headache
 Primordial
 The Red Chord
 Revocation
 Rivers of Nihil
 Sacrifice
 Satan
 Serpentine Dominion
 Shai Hulud
 Six Feet Under
 Skyforger
 Slough Feg
 Soilent Green
 System Divide
 Transatlantic
 Tombs
 Twitching Tongues
 Týr
 Uncle Acid & the Deadbeats
 Vio-lence
 Vomitory
 Whitechapel
 Wovenwar
 The Zenith Passage

Former

 3
 Abiotic
 The Absence
 Akercocke
 Aletheian
 Anacrusis (active)
 Ancient (active)
 Anterior (disbanded 2012)
 Anvil (active)
 Angel Witch
 John Arch (inactive)
 Artch (active)
 As I Lay Dying (active, with Nuclear Blast)
 Atheist (active)
 Austrian Death Machine (on hiatus)
 Autumn
 Believer (active, Independent)
 Between the Buried and Me (active, with Sumerian)
 Beyond the Embrace (inactive)
 Bison B.C.
 Bolt Thrower
 Born from Pain
 Brain Drill (disbanded 2019)
 Callenish Circle (disbanded 2007)
 Cellador
 Chemlab (active)
 Cirith Ungol (disbanded 1992; reformed 2016)
 Cradle of Filth (active, with Nuclear Blast)
 The Crimson Armada (disbanded 2012)
 Cycle Sluts from Hell
 Dance Club Massacre
 Dark Funeral
 Darkness Dynamite
 Demiricous (active)
 Dirty Rotten Imbeciles (active)
 Eidolon (on hiatus)
 Enthroned
 Epidemic
 Evergreen Terrace (active, with Rise Records)
 Flotsam and Jetsam (active, Driven Music Group)
 Fragments of Unbecoming
 Galactic Cowboys (disbanded 2000)
 Goo Goo Dolls (active, with Warner Bros. Records)
 Hatchet
 Hate Eternal
 Haunted Garage
 Hecate Enthroned (active; signed to M-Theory Audio)
 Helstar (active, with AFM Records)
 Hirax (active, with Black Devil Records)
 I Killed the Prom Queen (active, with Epitaph Records)
 Impious
 In Battle (active, with Nocturnal Art Production/Candlelight Records)
 Into the Moat
 Jacobs Dream
 King's X (active, with Inside Out Music)
 Lazarus A.D. (disbanded 2015 )
 Liege Lord (disbanded 1990) (reformed 2013)
 Lord Belial (disbanded, then reactivated)
 Manowar (active, with Magic Circle Music)
 Mentors (active)
 Molotov Solution (on hiatus)
 Mount Salem
 Omen (active, with DSN Music)
 Overcast
 Powerwolf (active, now signed to Napalm Records)
 Psyopus (disbanded 2012)
 Pyrithion
 The Red Death
 Rigor Mortis
 Sacred Reich (active, with Hollywood Records)
 Sacrifice (active)
 Slayer (disbanded 2019)
 Sonic Reign
 Spock's Beard (active, independent)
 Symphorce (disbanded 2011)
 Taramis (disbanded 1993)
 This Ending
 Thought Industry
 Tommy Giles Rogers
 Torture Killer (active, with Dynamic Art Records)
 Tourniquet, (active, with Pathogenic Records)
 Trigger the Bloodshed
 Trouble (active, with Century Media Records)
 Unearth
 Vader (active, with Nuclear Blast)
 Viking (disbanded 1990, reformed 2011, currently unsigned)
 Voivod (active, with Century Media Records)
 Woe of Tyrants
 Yob (active, with Profound Lore Records)

See also
 Metal Massacre
 List of record labels
Megaforce Records

References

External links
 
 Official YouTube Channel

American record labels
Record labels established in 1982
Heavy metal record labels
1982 establishments in the United States